Harry Gladwin Byrd (February 3, 1925 – May 14, 1985) was an American Major League Baseball right-handed starting pitcher who played for the Philadelphia Athletics, New York Yankees, Baltimore Orioles, Chicago White Sox, and Detroit Tigers. He was born in Darlington, South Carolina.

Byrd pitched in six games with the Athletics in 1950, spent a season back in the minors, and was called back up to the big club in 1952. That year he enjoyed his best season, going 15–15 with a 3.31 earned run average (ERA) and being selected as the American League Rookie of the Year.

In 1953 Byrd went 11–20, but he worked 237 innings. At the start of the 1954 season, he was part of a ten-player trade between the Athletics and Yankees. In New York he finished 9–7 with a 2.99 ERA. At the end of the season, he was sent to the Orioles as part of a 17-player mega-deal.

Byrd went 3–2 with Baltimore in 1955, before being shipped off again to the White Sox. He finished with a combined 7–8 record with a 4.61 ERA. After pitching briefly with the Sox in 1956, he ended his career in 1957 with the Tigers.

In a seven-year career, Byrd compiled a 46–54 record with 381 strikeouts and a 4.35 ERA in 827 innings.

Byrd lived in the small logging community of Mont Clare, just outside his birthplace of Darlington, South Carolina. He died in Darlington at age of 60 after a bout with lung cancer. Darlington named a road after him (Harry Byrd Highway), which eventually became Bobo Newsom Highway, named after another major-league pitcher from the area (Hartsville).

External links

Harry Byrd at Baseballbiography.com
Historic Baseball

1925 births
1985 deaths
American League All-Stars
Baltimore Orioles players
Baseball players from South Carolina
Birmingham Barons players
Buffalo Bisons (minor league) players
Centauros de Maracaibo players
Charleston Senators players
Chicago White Sox players
Deaths from cancer in South Carolina
Deaths from lung cancer
Detroit Tigers players
Hawaii Islanders players
Major League Baseball pitchers
Major League Baseball Rookie of the Year Award winners
Martinsville A's players
Miami Marlins (IL) players
New York Yankees players
Omaha Cardinals players
People from Darlington, South Carolina
Philadelphia Athletics players
Portland Beavers players
Savannah Indians players